The 2018 Hi-Tec Oils Bathurst 6 Hour was an endurance race for Group 3E Series Production Cars. The event, which was staged at the Mount Panorama Circuit, near Bathurst, in New South Wales, Australia, on 1 April 2018, was the third running of the Bathurst 6 Hour. The race was won by Grant and Iain Sherrin, driving a BMW M4 F82.

Class structure 
Cars competed in the following classes:
 Class A1: Extreme Performance (Forced Induction)
 Class A2: Extreme Performance (Naturally Aspirated)
 Class B1: High Performance (Forced Induction)
 Class B2: High Performance (Naturally Aspirated)
 Class C: Performance
 Class D: Production
 Class E: Compact

Results 

 Class winners are shown in bold text.
 Race time of winning car: 6:01:42.874
 Pole position: 2:22.904, Tim Leahey
 Fastest race lap: 2:26.027, Tim Leahey

References 

Motorsport in Bathurst, New South Wales
Hi-Tec Oils Bathurst 6 Hour